Bob Penberthy is a former rugby union player who set the record for appearances (with 877) for Pontypridd RFC between 1961 and 1985.

He was known as the Bionic Elbow.

References

Year of birth missing (living people)
Living people
Welsh rugby union players
Pontypridd RFC players